Forcipator is a genus of beetles in the family Carabidae, containing the following species:

 Forcipator cylindricus (Dejean, 1825)
 Forcipator grandis (Perty, 1830)
 Forcipator putzeysi (Chaudoir, 1868)
 Forcipator sanctihilarii (Latreille, 1829)

References

Scaritinae